Sea Launch Commander is the command ship for Sea Launch. , she was registered in Liberia. Her home port is Long Beach, California.

History

Sea Launch Commander was commissioned by Sea Launch, after Sea Launch was established in 1995 as a consortium of four companies from Norway, Russia, Ukraine and the United States, managed by Boeing with participation from the other shareholders.
She was built by Kvaerner Govan Ltd at Govan shipyard in Glasgow, Scotland, and launched in 1997.

In the fall of 1997, the ship sailed for Russia, where special equipment for handling rocket components and for commanding and controlling launches was installed and tested. She arrived in Long Beach, California, on July 13, 1998, after a voyage through the Panama Canal.

The first rocket launch controlled by Sea Launch Commander was in March 1999.
The ship originally carried colors representing the majority ownership of Sea Launch by a Ukrainian company.

Following a 2009 bankruptcy of the company,
Energia—which already owned 25% of Sea Launch—acquired a controlling interest of 85% in the Sea Launch company and therefore in Sea Launch Commander.
As a result, the company planned to begin land-based launches from the Baikonur Cosmodrome in early 2011, while sea-based launches were to resume in September 2011.
The ship currently carries colors representing the majority ownership of Sea Launch by a Russian company.

While docked in Long Beach in 2013, Sea Launch Commander served as a filming location for the Marvel film Captain America: The Winter Soldier, portraying the fictional S.H.I.E.L.D. vessel Lemurian Star.

Technical description

The Assembly and Command Ship—or ACS, and subsequently named Sea Launch Commander—was an all-new, purpose-built vessel that serves as a floating rocket assembly factory while in port, provides crew and customer accommodations and also houses mission control facilities for launches at sea.

The ACS provides accommodations for up to 240 crew members, customers and VIPs—including medical facilities, a dining room, recreation and entertainment facilities.

References

External links

1997 ships
Ships of the United States
Ships built in Govan

Auxiliary ships